The Grand Falls Andcos were a senior ice hockey team based in Grand Falls, Newfoundland and Labrador in the Newfoundland Senior Hockey League that won six Herder Memorial Trophies in seven years as all-Newfoundland champions. With the support of the Anglo-Newfoundland Development Company (A.N.D. Co.), owners of the town's pulp and paper mill and the builder of a new state-of-the-art stadium in 1947, the team that later became known as the Andcos built a strong roster with imported players and dominated Newfoundland senior hockey during the 1950s.

History
Grand Falls was established in 1905 as a company-built town and was administered by the Anglo Newfoundland Development Company Ltd (A.N.D. Co. Ltd.) until 1961 when the town was incorporated as a municipality (The mill was acquired in 1961 by Price Brothers). The Grand Falls Athletic Association (GFAA) organized and governed hockey in the town including management of the Grand Falls All-Stars hockey club.

GFAA was picking players from the local senior league to form an all-star team at least as early as 1928 and occasionally played inter-town games with other hockey centres, including St. John's, Corner Brook, Buchans and Bay Roberts, before hockey was organized island-wide. In 1935, at the conclusion of the annual home and home inter-papertown series between Grand Falls and Corner Brook, it was agreed that Corner Brook would represent Western Newfoundland to play the eastern champion Guards from St. John's in a two-game series at the Prince's Rink to determine the first hockey champions of Newfoundland. Corner Brook were victorious and were awarded the first Herder Memorial Trophy. The Newfoundland Amateur Hockey Association was formed in December 1935 and beginning in 1936 the Western division champion would travel to the capital city in March to participate in the Herder Championship series.

The A.N.D. Co. funded the construction of a new stadium for Grand Falls in 1947. It was a state-of-the-art facility when it opened in the winter of 1948. Equipped with a new arena capable of holding thousands of patrons and generating significant revenues, Grand Falls started hiring 'import' hockey playing-coaches to compete with the Buchans Miners and the strong St. John's teams. The GFAA improved its entry in the race for the Herder Trophy by first hiring Moncton native and NHL Hall of famer Gordie Drillon as playing-coach for the 1948-49 season. Drillon arrived in Grand Falls on November 20, 1948. Two days later the Grand Falls Stadium was officially opened. Joe Byrne was hired as head coach for the 1949-50 season and arrived in Grand Falls in early December 1949. He coached the all-stars for several seasons. Before the start of the 1952-53 season the GFAA hired three playing coaches including PEI native Wes "Bucko" Trainor, who played 17 games with the New York Rangers in 1948-49. In the winter of 1953 Trainor helped Grand Falls capture its first all-Newfoundland championship and Herder Memorial Trophy.

The Grand Falls All-Stars, renamed the Andcos in January 1956., won five straight Herder championships from 1955 to 1959 but the once dominant hockey club folded at the end of the 1964-65 season. After a year without an entry from the town in the Newfoundland Amateur Hockey Association, the Grand Falls-Cataracts were formed in the fall of 1966.

Seasons and records

Season by season results

Note: GP = Games played, W = Wins, L = Losses, T = Ties, OTL = Overtime Losses, Pts = Points, GF = Goals for, GA = Goals against, DNQ = Did not qualify

NAHA, Sr. = Newfoundland Amateur Hockey Association senior division, NAHA, Sr. A = Newfoundland Amateur Hockey Association senior Section A,  NSHL = Newfoundland Senior Hockey League (1962-1989)

Note: There were no regular season games from 1947 through 1962. Teams played exhibition games which was followed by the NAHA playoffs.

All-time roster

Leaders

Captains
Eric Dwyer, 1949–50
Eddie Walsh, 1950–51
Dave Green, 1951–53
Jim McDonald, 1953–54
Neil Amadio, 1954–55
Jack Mackenzie, 1955–56
Orin Carver, 1957–58
James 'Bucky' Hannaford, 1958–59
Leo Murphy, 1964–65

Head coaches
Gordie Drillon, 1948–49
Joe Byrne, 1949–52, 1953-54 (replacement), 1961–62
Wes Trainor, 1952–53, 1955–58
Alex Robinson, 1953–54
Neil Amadio, 1954–55
Ray LaCroix, 1958–59
Jean-Marc Pichette, 1959–60,1962–63 
James "Bucky" Hannaford, 1960–61
Jacques LaChesvesque, 1963–64
Vic Fildes, 1964–65

Trophies and awards

Team awards
Six all-Newfoundland senior hockey championships (Herder Memorial Trophy): 1953, 1955, 1956, 1957, 1958, 1959

Individual awards

Cliff Gorman Memorial Award (Most valuable player of the Herder Playoffs)

Honoured Members

Retired Numbers
 #7 Al Dwyer Jr.
 #12 Jim Temple

NL Hockey Hall of Fame
The following people who were members of the Andcos/All-Stars have been inducted into the Newfoundland and Labrador Hockey Hall of Fame.

Note: (the year of induction is noted)

George Faulkner (1994)
Alex Faulkner (1994)
Joe Byrne (1995)
Allan Dwyer Jr. (1996)
Walt Davis (1999)
Leo Murphy (1999)
Harold Stanley (2000)
Jim Temple (2001)
Clarence Goulding (2008)
Allan Bargery (2009)
Cecil Thomas (2018)

References

Bibliography

Defunct Ice hockey teams in Newfoundland and Labrador
Grand Falls-Windsor
1956 establishments in Newfoundland and Labrador
Ice hockey clubs established in 1956
Sports clubs disestablished in 1965
1965 disestablishments in Newfoundland and Labrador